West Bay railway station was  the terminus of the Bridport Railway in western Dorset, England. In 1879, the Great Western Railway, who held the operating licence for the original Bridport Railway (which ran as far as Bridport town), decided to extend the railway to Bridport Harbour. Construction started in 1883, and the line opened  on 31 March 1884. The station was called  West Bay by the GWR in order to encourage holiday traffic. The line between West Bay and Bridport closed to passengers in 1930, and operated for goods services only until its final closure in 1962.

The site today

After many years as the office of a boat yard, in 1995 the station was restored with a short length of track at the platform. The station building has operated sporadically as a cafe since then.  From West Bay, a section of the former track bed can now be walked into Bridport.

References

 
 
 
 Station on navigable O.S. map

Disused railway stations in Dorset
Former Great Western Railway stations
Railway stations in Great Britain opened in 1884
Railway stations in Great Britain closed in 1916
Railway stations in Great Britain opened in 1920
Railway stations in Great Britain closed in 1921
Railway stations in Great Britain opened in 1921
Railway stations in Great Britain closed in 1924
Railway stations in Great Britain opened in 1924
Railway stations in Great Britain closed in 1930
Bridport